Bahiri is a census town in Tamluk subdivision of Purba Medinipur district in the Indian state of West Bengal.

Demographics
 India census, Bahirgram had a population of 8288. Males constitute 51% of the population and females 49%. Bahirgram has an average literacy rate of 63%, higher than the national average of 59.5%; with 56% of the males and 44% of females literate. 14% of the population is under 6 years of age.

References

Cities and towns in Purba Medinipur district